Noian Wala also spell as Noin Wala, is a town and Union Council in Wazirabad Tehsil, Gujranwala District, Punjab, Pakistan.

See also

 Gujranwala
 Wazirabad
 Badoki Saikhwan
 Udhowali
 Hamboki
 Kot Ladha
 Chabba Sindhwan

References

Cities and towns in Gujranwala District
Populated places in Wazirabad Tehsil
Union councils of Wazirabad Tehsil